Steven Cole (born 1949) is an American opera singer. He is particularly known for his portrayal of tenor character roles in an international career spanning more than 30 years. He sang in the world premieres of Jean Prodromides's La Noche Triste, Gavin Bryars's Medea, and the revised version of György Ligeti's  Le Grand Macabre.

Life and career
Cole was born in Baltimore, Maryland. He studied sociology and anthropology at Union College and singing at the Peabody Conservatory and at the Royal College of Music, Stockholm. After graduating from Union College in 1971, he was awarded a Watson Fellowship and pursued further vocal training in England. He made his professional debut as Monsieur Triquet in Eugene Onegin at the Tanglewood Festival in 1974 in a Boston Symphony Orchestra performance conducted by Seiji Ozawa. Cole went on to sing in major opera houses and festivals across North America and Europe, including the Metropolitan Opera, San Francisco Opera, Paris Opera, Gran Teatre del Liceu, and the Salzburg Festival. His discography includes  Orphée aux enfers conducted by Marc Minkowski, Le Grand Macabre conducted by Esa-Pekka Salonen,  The Magic Flute conducted by William Christie, and The Rake's Progress conducted by Kent Nagano.

Repertoire
Cole's wide-ranging repertoire spans operas from the Baroque era to the 20th century. His roles from 1974 to the present have included:

Absalom Kumalo in  Lost in the Stars
Aguilar in Jean Prodromidès's  La noche triste (world premiere, Théâtre des Champs-Élysées, 1989) 
Alceo in Antonio Cesti's L'Argia
Andrès, Frantz, Pitichinaccio, and Spalanzani  in The Tales of Hoffmann
Antonio in Les brigands
Creon in Gavin Bryars's Medea (world premiere, Opéra de Lyon, 1984).
Dancing Master in Ariadne auf Naxos 
Don Basilio in The Marriage of Figaro 
Elder Gleaton in Susannah 
Flute in A Midsummer Night's Dream
Fool in Wozzeck  
Goro in Madama Butterfly
John Styx in Orphée aux enfers 
Lilaque, père in Boulevard Solitude
Linfea in La Calisto 
Ménélas in La belle Hélène
Monostatos in The Magic Flute
Monsieur Triquet in Eugene Onegin 
Nick in La fanciulla del West
Oberon in Oberon 
Osmin in L'incontro improvviso 
Pedrillo in The Abduction From the Seraglio.
Pisandro in Il ritorno d'Ulisse in patria
Remendado in Carmen
Rodisbe in Antonio Sartorio's Giulio Cesare in Egitto
Scrivener in Khovanshchina 
Sellem in The Rake's Progress
Simpleton in Boris Godunov
Sobrinin in A Life for the Tsar
Spoletta in Tosca 
Sportin' Life in Porgy and Bess 
Squeak in Billy Budd 
Teapot, Frog, and Little Old Man in L'enfant et les sortilèges.
White Minister in Le Grand Macabre (world premiere of the revised version, Salzburg Festival, 1997) 
Witch in Hansel and Gretel

References

External links
Artist's page at Columbia Artists Management

1949 births
Living people
Musicians from Baltimore
Classical musicians from Maryland
American operatic tenors
20th-century African-American male singers
20th-century American male opera singers
African-American male opera singers
Singers from Maryland
21st-century African-American male singers